= Jeffrey Teitz =

American politician

Member of the Rhode Island House of Representatives
- In office 1973–1997

Personal details
- Born: Jeffrey Teitz; May 12, 1953 (age 73) Newport, Rhode Island, U.S.
- Party: Democratic
- Education: Harvard College (BA); Fordham University (MA)
- Occupation: Attorney

Jeffrey Teitz (born May 12, 1953) is an American politician and lawyer in the state of Rhode Island. He served in the Rhode Island House of Representatives from 1973 to 1997 as a member of the Democratic Party. He is Jewish.
